The Mission City Hot Rhythm Cats is a 6-piece (formerly 4-piece) traditional jazz band based in San Antonio, TX.  The band organized in early 2008 and is composed of several former members (shown listed with an asterisk) of the Jim Cullum Jazz Band.

The band recently added bass saxophonist Jonathan Doyle to their regular lineup.  Mr. Doyle's performance on bass saxophone has been compared to well-known 1920's/1930's bass saxophonist Adrian Rollini.

During a personal interview with the author, co-leader and trombonist Mike Pittsley, along with co-leader and cornetist/clarinetist David Jellema, both stated that the change to a 6-piece band has been extremely positive, with the band receiving excellent reviews for the group's enthusiasm, as well as for the band's high level of musicianship.

The group frequently adds talented, well-known local area guest musicians to their lineup from time to time. The group cites influences such as Louis Armstrong, Bix Beiderbecke, Jelly Roll Morton, Jack Teagarden and Fats Waller (among others), as well as some of the hot Chicago-style jazz bands of the 1930s and 1940s.

As a result of the new 6-piece instrumentation, the Mission City Hot Rhythm Cats has also been in demand to perform material from the big band swing era, citing swing influences such as Louis Jordan, Louis Prima, Benny Goodman and Count Basie.

American jazz ensembles from Texas
Musical groups from San Antonio
Jazz musicians from Texas